Llegó La India Via Eddie Palmieri (La India Has Arrived Via Eddie Palmieri) is a salsa album by Puerto Rican-American singer La India in collaboration with pianist Eddie Palmieri. It was released in the US by Soho Sounds in 1992 and features songs in Spanish and English. The album was also released in the UK by Acid Jazz Records in 1993.

Reception

AllMusic awarded the album 3.5 stars out of 5. The album peaked at number 5 in the US Tropical Albums charts. La India was subsequently nominated for a Premio Lo Nuestro award in 1993 in the Female Artist of the Year, Tropical/Salsa, category

Track listing
 "Vivir Sin Ti" (Eddie Palmieri, arr. Eddie Palmieri) — 5:02
 "Llegó La India" (Eddie Palmieri, arr. Eddie Palmieri) — 6:30
 "Soledad" (India, Eddie Palmieri, Shirley Marte, Patrick Morales, arr. Eddie Palmieri and Nelson Jaime) — 4:35
 "Mi Primera Rumba" (Eddie Palmieri, arr. Eddie Palmieri) — 5:38
 "Yemaya y Ochun (Prelude)" (Milton Cardona, arr. Milton Codona) — 2:15
 "Yemaya y Ochun" (Eddie Palmieri, arr. Eddie Palmieri) — 5:42
 "Merengue Internacional" (Eddie Palmieri, arr. Eddie Palmieri and Nelson Jaime) — 5:48
 "Solitude" (India, Eddie Palmieri, Shirley Marte, arr. Eddie Palmieri and Nelson Jaime) — 4:35
 "I Wanna Dance" (India, Eddie Palmieri, Shirley Marte, arr. Eddie Palmieri and Nelson Jaime) — 4:30
 "Soledad/Bi-Lingual Version" (India, Eddie Palmieri, Shirley Marte, Patrick Morales, arr. Eddie Palmieri and Nelson Jaime) — 6:19

Chart performance

Personnel
La India – vocals
Eddie Palmieri – piano, arranger, producer
Johnny Torres – bass
Charlie Sepúlveda – trumpet
Barry Danielian – trumpet
Nelson Jaime – trumpet
Brian Lynch – trumpet
Conrad Herwig – trombone
David Sánchez – tenor saxophone
José Claussell – percussion, timbales
Jimmy Delgado – bongo, bells, timbales
Milton Cardona – conga, shekere, iyá 
Theodore Holliday II – itotele
Jesús Andújar – tambora
Ricardo Mejía Carreras – guira
Pepe Conde Rodríguez – clave
Pedro E. Rodríguez – maracas
Johnny Torres, Milton Cardona, Pepe Conde Rodriquez, Pedro E. Rodríguez, India, Connie Harvey, Benny Diggs – chorus

References 

1992 albums
La India albums
Acid jazz albums